100 Oaks Mall (sometimes written out as One Hundred Oaks Mall) is a shopping mall located three miles south of downtown Nashville, Tennessee along Interstate 65 and Tennessee State Route 155. Neighborhoods and cities around the area include Berry Hill, Woodbine and Oak Hill.

History
The mall was Nashville's second enclosed shopping area, originally opening on October 27, 1967, after Harding Mall opened two years before. Original tenants included JCPenney, Woolco and Harveys. It closed in 1983, although Burlington Coat Factory opened in the former Woolco in 1985. The mall fully reopened in 1989 but began declining again soon afterward. Belz Enterprises re-developed the center in 1995 as an outlet mall, introducing big-box stores such as Michaels, Media Play, and TJ Maxx.

Following an extensive renovation in 2008, the bottom floor of the mall remains open for retail, with major tenants including hhgregg (now defunct), Kirkland's, Electronic Express, and PetSmart. The upper floor and office building are now used for medical clinics and administrative offices operated by Vanderbilt University Medical Center. Tennessee's largest movie theater, the Regal Cinemas Hollywood 27, is located next to the mall.

References

Official Website

Shopping malls in Tennessee
Buildings and structures in Nashville, Tennessee
Shopping malls established in 1968
1968 establishments in Tennessee